Olcott Light was built on a pier in Olcott, New York at Eighteen Mile Creek, named for being eighteen miles from the Niagara River at Lake Ontario. The light was no longer needed in the 1930s, and was moved to a local yacht club, where it resided until the early 1960s when it was destroyed.  In the summer of 2003, a replica was built from old photographs.

Notes

References
"Olcott Light Rebuilt," Bill Edwards, Lighthouse Digest, April, 2004.

Further reading
 Oleszewski, Wes. Great Lakes Lighthouses, American and Canadian: A Comprehensive Directory/Guide to Great Lakes Lighthouses, (Gwinn, Michigan: Avery Color Studios, Inc., 1998) .
 
 U.S. Coast Guard. Historically Famous Lighthouses (Washington, D.C.: Government Printing Office, 1957).
 Wright, Larry and Wright, Patricia. Great Lakes Lighthouses Encyclopedia Hardback (Erin: Boston Mills Press, 2006)

External links
 
 Lighthouse Friends
 US-Lighthouses.com
 Rudy and Alice's Lighthouse page
 Lighthouse Depot

Lighthouses completed in 1873
Lighthouses completed in 2003
Lighthouses in New York (state)
Transportation buildings and structures in Niagara County, New York
Lighthouses of the Great Lakes